The Thunderdrome! is a group that holds races at the Dorais Velodrome in Detroit, MI

External links
 Cycle Canada covering the Thunder Drome!
 Urban Outfitters coverage of the group.
 Video of one of the group's events.
 Coverage by Detroit MetroMix.
 
 Coverage by Hell for Leather Magazine.
 

Cycle racing in the United States
Cycling in Detroit